Goodgame is a surname. Notable people with the surname include:

Matthew Goodgame (born c. 1980), British actor
Randall Goodgame (born 1974), American singer-songwriter
Rebecca Goodgame Ebinger (born 1975), American judge
Tony Goodgame (born 1946), British footballer

See also
Capt. Goodgame House
Goodgame Studios

English-language surnames